Michaeley O'Brien is an Australian television writer, script editor and script producer. Born in Mudgee, she grew up in Gulgong and studied at Charles Sturt University in Bathurst as well as the Australian Film Television and Radio School. She worked as script producer on Water Rats and McLeod's Daughters and most recently wrote episodes of Underbelly: Razor.

Mystery Road, Episode 1, Gone, was shortlisted for the NSW Premier's Literary Awards, Betty Rowland Prize for Scripwriting, 2019.

Selected credits
Home and Away
Blue Heelers
Neighbours
McLeod's Daughters
Out of the Blue
All Saints
City Homicide
Rescue: Special Ops
Sea Patrol
Underbelly: Razor

References

External links

Michaeley O'Brien at National Film and Sound Archive

Australian writers
Year of birth missing (living people)
Living people
Charles Sturt University alumni